Emmanuel Nii Okai Laryea is a Ghanaian politician and member of the Seventh Parliament of the Fourth Republic of Ghana representing the Amasaman Constituency in the Greater Accra Region on the ticket of the National Democratic Congress.

Personal life and education 
Laryea was born on 16 August 1983 in a town called Gbese-Accra in his region. He had his Bachelor of Arts degree in Political Science and Information Studies from the University of Ghana, Legon. Prior to his appointment into parliament, he was the chief executive officer at Commanex Investment Limited.

Political career 
He was first elected into parliament on 7 January 2013 after the completion of the 2012 Ghanaian General Elections. He was then reelected on 7 January 2016 after the completion of the 2016 Ghanaian General Elections where he obtained 49.83% of the valid votes cast.

Personal life 
He is a Christian and single.

References

1983 births
Living people
Ghanaian MPs 2017–2021
National Democratic Congress (Ghana) politicians